Templetuohy (Irish Teampall Tuaithe), often written Templetouhy, is a village in County Tipperary, Ireland. It is situated in the townland of Longorchard in the civil parish of Templetouhy. The local GAA club is Moyne–Templetuohy GAA which is organised by Tipperary GAA. The village is joined to Moyne to form the ecclesiastical parish of Templetuohy and Moyne in the Roman Catholic Archdiocese of Cashel and Emly. According to the 2016 census, the village had a population of 282.

References

Towns and villages in County Tipperary